Coggs v Bernard (1703) 2 Ld Raym 909 (also Coggs v Barnard) is a landmark case both for English property law and contract law, decided by Sir John Holt, Chief Justice of the King's Bench. It sets out the duties owed by a bailee – someone in possession of property owned by another.

Facts
William Bernard undertook to carry several barrels of brandy belonging to John Coggs from Brooks Market, Holborn to Water Street, just south of the Strand (about half a mile).  Bernard's undertaking was gratuitous; he was not offered compensation for his work.  As the brandy was being unloaded at the Water Street cellar, a barrel was staved and 150 gallons were lost.

Coggs brought an action on the case against Bernard, alleging he had undertaken to carry the barrels but had spilled them through his negligence.

Judgment
Holt CJ at the London Guildhall found that Mr Bernard, the defendant, was negligent in carrying the casks and was therefore liable as a bailee. Holt made clear that Bernard's responsibility to Coggs was not formally contractual in nature, since he received no consideration. Instead, his responsibility rested on the trust that Coggs placed in him to use due care in transporting the casks, and by his tacit acceptance of that trust by taking the casks into his custody.  Thus, because Bernard acted negligently when he was under a responsibility to use care, he was held to be in breach of a trust.

In the course of his judgment, Holt gave this well-known statement of the categories of bailment:

The case overturned the then leading case in the law of bailments, Southcote's Case (1601), which held that a general bailee was strictly liable for any damage or loss to the goods in his possession (e.g., even if the goods were stolen from him by force). Under the ruling in Coggs v Bernard, a general bailee was only liable if he had been negligent.  Despite his reappraisal of the standard of liability for general bailees, Holt CJ refused to reconsider the long-standing common law rule that held common carriers strictly liable for any loss or damage to bailed property in their possession.  Although admitting that the rule was "hard," Holt CJ justified it by stating:
This [rule] is a politik establishment, contrived by the policy of the law, for the safety of all persons, the necessity of whose affairs oblige them to trust these sorts of persons [i.e. carriers], that they may be safe in their ways of dealing: for else these carriers might have an opportunity of undoing all persons that had any dealings with them, by combining with thieves etc; and yet doing it in such a clandestine manner, as would not be possible to be discovered. And this is the reason the law is founded upon that point.

Sir John Powell concurred. He began his decision by saying, echoing Sir Edward Coke's famous dictum, "Let us consider the reason of the case. For nothing is law that is not reason."

See also
Ball v Coggs (1710) 1 Brown PC 140, 1 ER 471 and Ball v Lord Lanesborough (1713) 5 Brown PC 480, 2 ER 809, show that Mr Coggs was made bankrupt (Stat 8 Anne c 28 (1709)) after litigation from a former manager of a brass wire works, of which Coggs had been partner and treasurer. He had to pay £5,000.
Lane v Cotton (1701) Salk 18 per Holt C.J.: “It is a hard thing to charge a carrier [with strict liability]: but if he should not be charged, he might keep a correspondence with thieves, and cheat the owner of his goods, and he should never be able to prove it”. The law presumes against the common carrier (i.e. imposes strict liability) “to prevent litigation, collusion, and the necessity of going into circumstances impossible to be unravelled”.
Forward v Pittard (1785) 1 Term Rep. 27 at 33 per Lord Mansfield.
Riley v Horne (1828) 5 Bing. 217, 220 per Best C.J. 
Somes v British Empire Shipping Co (1860) 8 H.L.C. 338
The Katingaki [1976] 2 Lloyd's Rep 372
The Winson [1981] 3 All E.R. 688 at 689
Nugent v Smith (1876) 101, Cockburn CJ, strict liability of the common carrier said to be a, “principle of extreme rigour, peculiar to our own law, and the absence of which in the law of other nations has not been found by experience to lead to the evils for the prevention of which the rule of our law was supposed to be necessary.”

Notes

References
 Barbara Cherry, The Crisis in Telecommunications Carrier Liability (Kluwer Academic Publishers 1999):13.
D Ibbetson, 'Coggs v Barnard' in C Mitchell and P Mitchell, Landmark Cases in the Law of Contract (2008)
NE Palmer, Bailment (2nd ed, 1991) 124–5

English property case law
1703 in law
1703 in England
Lord Holt cases
English implied terms case law
Court of King's Bench (England) cases